Charles Clive Bigham, 2nd Viscount Mersey,  (18 August 1872 – 20 November 1956) was a British peer and Liberal politician.

Biography 
The son of John Bigham, 1st Viscount Mersey, Bigham was educated at Cheam School, Eton College (where he was a King's Scholar) and Sandhurst, and was commissioned into the Grenadier Guards in 1892. Finding soldiering uncongenial, he joined the reserves and travelled to the Ottoman Empire, Persia, Russia, China, and the Balkans, holding appointments as honorary attaché to various British embassies along the way. In 1897 he became special correspondent to The Times during the Greco-Turkish War, following the Ottoman Army. At the end of the war he was appointed honorary attaché to the British embassy at Constantinople at the request of Sir Philip Currie, in order to act as British representative on the International Repatriation Commission for displaced Greek peasants in Thessaly.

In 1899, he was transferred to the Peking embassy, and joined the Russian Army on campaign in Manchuria during the Boxer Rebellion. In 1900, he served as intelligence office to Admiral Sir Edward Seymour during the abortive Seymour Expedition, for which he was mentioned in dispatches. For his service in China he was appointed CMG. He contested Windsor for the Liberals in the 1906 general election, but narrowly lost.

He was Deputy Speaker of the House of Lords from 1933 and served as Liberal Chief Whip in the House of Lords from 1944 to 1949. In 1946 he was sworn of the Privy Council.

Mersey died on 20 November 1956 and was succeeded in his peerages by his son Edward Clive Bigham, 3rd Viscount Mersey.

References

External links 

 

Members of the Privy Council of the United Kingdom
Viscounts in the Peerage of the United Kingdom
Liberal Party (UK) hereditary peers
1872 births
1956 deaths
Companions of the Order of St Michael and St George
Commanders of the Order of the British Empire
Grenadier Guards officers
British diplomats
Fellows of the Society of Antiquaries of London
Liberal Party (UK) parliamentary candidates
British writers